Lycius (meaning 'Lycian' or 'wolf-like') is a minor Babylonian figure in Greek mythology, who features in two minor myths concerning the god Apollo. He was originally a man born to a wealthy family who disobeyed the orders of Apollo, thus becoming a white raven. Later the god made him his watchman.

Family 
Lycius was one of the four children of a rich Babylonian man named Clinis by his wife Harpe. He had two brothers, Harpasus and Ortygius, and a sister named Artemiche.

Mythology

Donkey sacrifice 
When his father Clinis saw the Hyperboreans sacrifice donkeys to Apollo, he meant to do the same, only to be prohibited under pain of death by the god himself. Lycius and Harpasus both urged their father to sacrifice the donkeys nevertheless, but Clinis called off the sacrifice, convinced by Ortygius and Artemiche, who advised him to obey Apollo. Lycius and Harpasus undid the halters of the donkeys anyway, and set to drive them towards the altar, thereupon Apollo drove the animals insane, who then attacked and began to devour the entire family. The family begged the gods to help them, and they were all transformed into various birds. Lycius was changed into a white raven by Apollo, the only member of the family to be saved directly by him. In ancient Greece, a 'white raven' came to be a proverbial expression about things that did not exist.

Coronis 
Sometime later, Lycius, now a raven, was tasked by Apollo to watch over Apollo's pregnant lover Coronis while he was gone. Coronis then proceeded to cheat on Apollo with a man named Ischys or Alcyoneus. Lycius immediately flew to Apollo and informed him of Coronis's infidelity. Enraged, Apollo took out his anger on Lycius, who instead had expected some sort of reward for his good job, and changed him into a black raven. An unspecified time later, he recounted his woes during a conversation with the crow, Corone, who had a similar grievance of her own concerning a god.

According to Istrus, a Greek historian, Lycius was eventually turned into the constellation of Corvus.

See also 

 Achilles (son of Zeus)
 Iynx
 Arge

References

Bibliography 
 Antoninus Liberalis, The Metamorphoses of Antoninus Liberalis translated by Francis Celoria (Routledge 1992). Online version at the Topos Text Project.
 Apollodorus, Apollodorus, The Library, with an English Translation by Sir James George Frazer, F.B.A., F.R.S. in 2 Volumes. Cambridge, MA, Harvard University Press; London, William Heinemann Ltd. 1921. Online version at the Perseus Digital Library.
 
 
 Hyginus, Gaius Julius, De Astronomica, in The Myths of Hyginus, edited and translated by Mary A. Grant, Lawrence: University of Kansas Press, 1960. Online version at ToposText.
 Ovid, Metamorphoses, Volume I: Books 1-8. Translated by Frank Justus Miller. Revised by G. P. Goold. Loeb Classical Library 42. Cambridge, MA: Harvard University Press, 1916.

External links 
 

Metamorphoses into birds in Greek mythology
Deeds of Apollo
Characters in Greek mythology
Asia in Greek mythology
Metamorphoses characters
Legendary birds